"Speak to Me" is a song by American singer Amy Lee recorded for the ending credits of the independent movie Voice from the Stone (2017). It was published online and made available for digital download on March 17, 2017. For the song, Lee collaborated with the movie's score producer Michael Wandmacher and director Eric Dennis Howell with whom she got acquainted to Voice from the Stone and its plot. Inspired by the movie's storyline, which she could relate to her personal life as a recent mother, Lee decided to contribute to the soundtrack with an original song. Musically, "Speak to Me" is a piano ballad instrumentally complete with strings, booming drums and cellos and features lyrics in which the protagonist pleads for love.

Upon its release, the song received critical acclaim from music critics most of whom praised its haunting and cinematic sound accompanied by the singer's trademark vocals. A music video for the song for which Lee collaborated with Howell was filmed at the same location as the movie, in Siena. It serves as a backstory to the movie and it features Lee singing the song and playing the piano in a gothic castle setting; shots of her walking at a garden with a boy are present throughout. As the song itself, the visual received positive feedback from critics who felt that it was a fitting accompaniment to the song's overall musical style and the movie's tone.

Background
Following the release of Evanescence's third self-titled studio album (2011) and its accompanying promoting tour (2011-12), the band went on a hiatus, with its group members starting to pursue individual projects. Lee started focusing on recording music for soundtracks and movies, releasing her first soundtrack album Aftermath in 2014 from the movie War Story. In October 2015, Lee revealed that although still not certain if the band would return to the music scene with newly recorded material, she definitely would go on recording and writing new solo music "with every intention of people hearing it". She started releasing cover versions of four songs on her official YouTube account; these songs were later compiled in her first EP album released in 2016, titled Recover, Vol. 1. Although Evanescence returned to stage in late 2015 and continued touring in 2016 and 2017, Lee continued writing and recording solo music. A children's album titled Dream Too Much consisting of songs inspired by and dedicated to her first child followed as part of her solo career. The beginning of 2017 also saw a single release of an English rework of the Italian song "L'amore esiste" (2015) by Francesca Michielin.

In August 2015, it was revealed that Lee would write music for the ending credits of the independent movie Voice from the Stone, directed by Eric Dennis Howell. In 2016, she started recording and finalizing the song; a video of her composing the song at Skywalker Ranch, where she played the piano and rehearsed the vocals was uploaded on her official YouTube channel on April 11, 2016. The video also featured various scenes of the movie itself set to snippets from the song. "Speak to Me" premiered on March 17, 2017 when it was also available for digital download on iTunes Store and several other digital music outlets. The digital single contains two versions of the song, the first one being the one featured in the movie and the second one being the studio recording of the song. Initially written only as the ending song of the movie only, "Speak to Me" was also used in the trailer after Howell and Wandmacher were both satisfied with the final result.

Recording and composition

Lee was initially contacted by the movie's director to write music for it. Closely related with both the director of the movie, Eric Howell, and the composer of its musical score, Michael Wandmacher, Lee had a conversation with both and "felt a surge of inspiration and immediately began writing" shortly afterwards. Lee elaborated how it was "a rare phenomenon to really share a creative vision so completely, and that made for a very powerful experience, and an end result that I am very proud of". She watched an unedited and incomplete version of Voice from the Stone in order to see if she would want to contribute to the movie's score; Lee was impressed by it.

Since Voice from the Stone follows the story of a nurse trying to help a mute young boy who has recently lost his mother speak again, Lee felt that the plot "resonated very deeply" with her due to the fact that she had recently become a mother. The song she was asked to write was meant to illustrate the child's deceased mother's perspective and the feelings of unlimited love that extend even beyond death. In the movie, the mother's character is a classical singer and a piano player who also enjoyed the perks of motherhood; Lee expressed her compatibility with the given description, saying, "There is no way that this could have been more me! It's meant to be me, it has to be me, and I'm writing this song!". The singer further added that "it wasn't a stretch, in any way, for me to put myself exactly in the spot where I needed to be to write this song".

Lee talked to the director and the score composer on the phone to discuss their opinions of what they think the ending song should sound like and Lee went to the piano right afterwards, conceiving the initial idea in an hour. She sent it to them afterwards and they both agreed that it is the direction they want to get on. Lee was invited to Skywalker Ranch which also served as the place where the movie's audio mixing was being handled. Lee went to record there for three days which marked the first time she had separated from her recent child. She revealed that the situation "put me in exactly the right place, emotionally, to sing and write from that emotional place that I needed to be in". The recording studio and the scenery at the ranch were the ideal environment for the singer to finish the writing process. Whenever she would get a writer's block composing at the piano, Lee would bike into the forest, during which she would "feel the beauty of earth and loneliness, at the same time". "Speak to Me" was completely recorded in two weeks.

"Speak to Me" is a piano-led ballad which features Lee's vocals which were described as "haunting". Besides piano, its instrumentation is also provided by subtle strings as well as low-sounding drums and cellos which according to Billboards Gil Kaufman "amp up the track's tension". According to Kaufman, the "chilling" song marked a return "into the spooky zone" for Lee. He further found her "signature emotion-choked vocals" present over the track's "haunting" piano line. Similar sentiments were offered by Riddhi Chakraborty from Rolling Stone India who felt that "Spoke to Me" marked a return to Lee's "signature style of powerhouse vocals combined with delicate piano", which he found to be similar to some of Evanescence's song, particularly "My Immortal" (2003) and "Lithium" (2006). Lyrically, the song finds the protagonist calling a "departed, ghostly" love as exemplified in the lyrics, "We are one breath apart, my love / And I'll be holding in it till we're together / Hear me call your name / Just speak, speak to me".

Critical reception
Billboards Gil Kaufman: "It's the perfect shot of Celtic-tinged gothic balladry for fans of Lee's band". Vanessa Vallon, writing for the website AXS noted that "Speak to Me" served as a demonstration by Lee of her "versatility"; she further described her vocal performance on the song as "gorgeously plead[ing]". Mike Wass from the music blog Idolator, deemed the song to be "strikingly beautiful" and noted how it "evokes the gothic drama and emotional intimacy of 'My Immortal'". Music Week journalist Ben Homewood felt that it would be an understatement to say that the song's usage in the trailer for the movie "heightens the drama on display". Writing for LemonWire, Jessica Tamez praised Lee's vocals, describing them as "liquid gold to say the very least" and adding that she managed to convey the same "intensity and beauty" characteristics of all her work. Tamez went on to praise the singer for her ability "adequately capture the depth of a situation and magnify that with such elegance [which] distinguishes her amongst fellow artists" and observed that the melody of "Speak to Me" managed to be a fitting accompaniment to the movie's profundity. Keith Spera from The Advocate described the song as "lush".

Music video
A music video for the song was filmed in Siena in Italy, which also served as the filming location for Voice from the Stone. Lee collaborated with Howell on the video and they both imagined it as a "parallel and backstory to the film" which explores the relationship between the main protagonist and her son and the notion that "love is stronger than death". The five-minute video features Lee singing and performing the song on a piano at a gothic Italian castle and walking around its surroundings. It opens with a close-up black-and-white shot of Lee lip-syncing the song's lyrics. She is later seen walking with a seemingly lonely child at a garden. For the clip, Lee is dressed in a medieval-styled gown which she co-designed with the Voice from the Stone costume designer.

The clip premiered on Lee's official YouTube channel on March 27, 2017. According to Chad Childers from Loudwire, it served as a proof that she was "certainly embracing the vibe and the feel" of the song. McKenzie Dillon from the website MXDWN, who described the song itself as "hauntingly beautiful" felt that its visual "follows the same tone". Lindy Smith from the Alternative Press summarized the clip as "visually-stunning" and "enchanting".

Live performances
"Speak to Me" was performed during the encore of the set list of Evanescence's Synthesis Tour (2017–18). The performance featured Lee playing the piano accompanied by an orchestra.

References

2017 songs
2017 singles
2010s ballads
Amy Lee songs
Songs written by Amy Lee
Songs written for films
Pop ballads